Țurcanu is a Romanian-language surname. Notable people with the surname include:

 Eugen Țurcanu (1925–1954), Romanian communist criminal
 Ion Țurcanu (born 1946), Moldovan historian, politician and scholar
 Iurie Țurcanu (born 1973), Moldovan politician
 Viorica Țurcanu (born 1954), Romanian fencer

See also
 Țurcan (surname)

Romanian-language surnames